

Central Auditing Commission (1919–1921)
 Dmitry Kursky (1874–1932)
 Anatoly Lunacharsky  (1875–1933)
 Ilya Tsivtsivadze (1881–1937)

Central Auditing Commission (1921–1924)
 Dmitry Kursky (1874–1932)
 Viktor Nogin  (1878–1924) — CAC Chairman
 Ivan Skvortsov-Stepanov (1870–1928)

Central Auditing Commission (1924–1925)
 Dmitry Kursky (1874–1932) — CAC Chairman
 Ivan Skvortsov-Stepanov (1870–1928)
 Józef Unszlicht  (1879–1938)

Central Auditing Commission (1926–1927)
 Aleksandr Asatkin-Vladimirskiy (1885–1937)
 Vilgelm Knorin (1890–1938)
 Dmitry Kursky (1874–1932) — CAC Chairman
 Boris Magidov (1884–1972)
 Sergey Stepanov (1876–1935)
 Mendel Khatayevich (1893–1937)
 Anton Tsikhon (1887–1939)

Central Auditing Commission (1927–1930)

Bodies of the Communist Party of the Soviet Union
1919 establishments in Russia
1921 disestablishments in Russia
1921 establishments in Russia
1924 disestablishments in the Soviet Union
1924 establishments in the Soviet Union
1925 disestablishments in the Soviet Union
1926 establishments in the Soviet Union
1927 disestablishments in the Soviet Union
1927 establishments in the Soviet Union
1930 disestablishments in the Soviet Union